Bacon is a Norman French surname originally from Normandy and England. In early sources, it also appears as "Bachun" and "Bacun".

Etymology
Its etymology is uncertain, with Charnock favoring a derivation from a diminutive of Germanic bach  ("little stream, creek") and others from an eponymous seigniory in Normandy or from a corruption of Beacon. It is sometimes folk etymologized from bacon or Germanic bag ("to fight").

List of people
Notable bearers of this surname include:

 Albion Fellows Bacon (1865–1933), American reformer and writer
 Anthony Bacon (1796–1864), British cavalry officer during the Napoleonic wars
 Anthony Bacon (1718–1786), English industrialist
 Augustus Octavius Bacon (1839–1914), American politician
 Benjamin Wisner Bacon (1860–1932), American theologian
 Brady Bacon (born 1990), USAC National Sprint Car driver
 Clara Latimer Bacon (1866–1948), American mathematician
 Charles James Bacon (1885–1968), American athlete
 Charles R. Bacon Late 20th century American geologist
 Coy Bacon (1942–2008), American football defensive lineman
 David Bacon, several people
 Don Bacon (baseball), American baseball manager
 Don Bacon (microbiologist) (1926–2020), New Zealand microbiologist
 Don Bacon (born 1963), American politician
 Ethan Bacon, Coiled Tubing Operator
 Edmund Bacon (1910–2005), American urban planner
 Edward Denny Bacon (1860–1938), British philatelist and curator (1913–1938) of the Royal Philatelic Collection
 Edward Woolsey Bacon (1843–1887), American Congregational preacher and writer
 Elizabeth Bacon (disambiguation)
 Elizabeth Bacon (died 1621), English aristocrat
 Elizabeth D. Bacon (1844-1917), American suffragist
 Elizabeth Bacon Custer (1842-1933), American author and public speaker
 Ephraim Bacon, American church minister
Ernie Bacon (1896–1972), English footballer
 Ernst Bacon (1898–1990), American composer and pianist
 Eugenia M. Bacon (1853-1933), American suffragist and public library advocate
 Everett Bacon (1890–1989), American football player from Wesleyan University, in College Football Hall of Fame
 Ezekiel Bacon (1776–1870), American politician
 Faith Bacon (1910 –1956), American dancer and actress
 Francis Bacon (1561–1626), knighted and ennobled English lawyer, philosopher, statesman and author
 Francis Bacon (1909–1992), Anglo-Irish painter
 Francis Thomas Bacon (1904–1992), British engineer
 Frank Bacon (1864–1922), American actor-playwright 
 Frank L. Bacon (1841–1917), American politician
 Fred E. Bacon (?–1954) British runner
 Frederick James Bacon (1871–1948) American banjoist and banjo manufacturer
 Frederick S. Bacon (1877–1861) American Football coach
 Gaspar G. Bacon (1886–1947), American politician
 George B. Bacon (1836–1876), American Congregational preacher and writer
 Henry Bacon (1866–1924), American architect
 Irving Bacon (1893–1965), American character actor
 Jim Bacon (politician) (1950–2004), Premier of Tasmania, Australia
 Jim Bacon ( 1896), Welsh rugby union and rugby league footballer
 John Bacon (c. 1290–1346), better known as John Baconthorpe, learned English Carmelite monk related to the Bacons
 John Bacon (1738–1820), US Representative from Massachusetts
 John Bacon (1740–1799), British sculptor
 John Bacon (1777–1859), British sculptor
 John Henry Frederick Bacon (1865–1914) British painter
 John M. Bacon, nineteenth-century American general
 John Mackenzie Bacon, FRAS (1846–1904), English astronomer, aeronaut, and lecturer
 Jono Bacon, Ubuntu Community Manager
 J. S. Bacon (1858–1939), American politician
 Kenneth Bacon (1944–2009), American journalist
 Kevin Bacon (born 1958), American film actor
 Leonard Bacon (1802–1881), American Congregational preacher and writer
 Leonard Woolsey Bacon (1830–1907), American Congregational preacher and writer
 Lise Bacon (born 1934), Canadian politician
 Lloyd Bacon (1889–1955), American actor
 Lucy Bacon (1857–1932), American artist
 Mabel Marks Bacon (1876 –1966), American hotelier
 Mathew Bacon, legal writer
 Max Bacon, lead singer for 1980s arena rock supergroup GTR
 Max Bacon ( 1941), Missouri jurist and legislator
 Michael Bacon (born 1949), American musician
 Montagu Bacon, English scholar and critic
 Nathaniel Bacon of the Virginia Colony, instigator of Bacon's Rebellion in 1676
 Sir Nathaniel Bacon ( 1622), lawyer and MP for Norfolk, half-brother of Francis Bacon
 Nathaniel Bacon, Jesuit, secretary of the Society of Jesus from 1674 to 1676
 Nathaniel Bacon (1585–1627), landowner and painter, nephew of Francis Bacon
 Nathaniel Bacon (1593–1660), a Member of Parliament representing Cambridge University and Ipswich, grandson of Nicholas Bacon
 Nicholas Bacon (1510–1579), English politician during the reign of Queen Elizabeth I, Lord Keeper of the Great Seal
 Sir Nicholas Bacon, 1st Baronet, of Redgrave (c. 1540–1624), his son, the first man created a baronet
 Sir Nicholas Bacon, 1st Baronet, of Gillingham (1623–1666), English lawyer
 Sir Nicholas Bacon, 14th Baronet (born 1953), Premier Baronet of England, lawyer, and Page of Honour to Queen Elizabeth II
 Nicholas Bacon (1622–1687), MP for Ipswich 1685–1687
 Nick Bacon (1945–2010), American soldier and Medal of Honor recipient
 Orrin Bacon (1821–1893), American politician
 Peggy Bacon (1895–1987), American artist and author
 Reginald Bacon (1863–1952), Royal Navy admiral
 Richard Bacon ( 1975), English television and radio presenter
 Richard Bacon, British politician
 Robert Bacon (1860–1919), American diplomat
 Robert L. Bacon (1884–1938), American politician
 Roger Bacon (1214–1295), Franciscan friar, English philosopher
 Ruth E. Bacon (1908–1985), American foreign service officer
 Samuel Bacon (1781–1820), American lawyer, newspaper editor and colonist
 Scott Bacon ( 1977), Australian politician, son of Jim Bacon
 Sosie Bacon ( 1992), American film actress
 Thomas Rutherford Bacon (1850–1913), American Congregational preacher, writer, professor of history
 Tim Bacon (1964-2016), British actor and restaurateur
 Virginia Cleaver Bacon (1883–1930), Oregon State Librarian.
 Walter Rathbone Bacon (1845–1917), American tramway executive
 Walter W. Bacon (1879–1962), American accountant and politician, Governor of Delaware
 Winchel Bacon, American politician
 Yehuda Bacon (born 1929), Israeli artist

Further lists
 Francis Bacon (disambiguation)
 Frank Bacon (disambiguation)
 Justice Bacon (disambiguation)
 Bacon baronets, a position in the English peerage held by several Bacons

See also
 Bacon (disambiguation)
 Bacon (cured meat prepared from a pig)

References

Citations

Bibliography
 .

Surnames
English-language surnames